Omar Barton (born June 21, 1985), better known by his stage name DJ Candlestick, is an American DJ, radio personality, and record producer. He is a member of The Chopstars of the ChopNotSlop subgenre, former on-air personality for KQBT 93.7 The Beat Houston, The Choice 90.9 KTSU (his alma mater) and DJ for The Nice Guys. He is the DJ behind Chop Care as well as many other ChopNotSlop mixtapes. He is currently a mixer on Drake’s radio station Sound42 on SiriusXM.

Biography

DJ Candlestick has been DJing since 2001. He is a member of The Chopstars (ChopNotSlop subgenre). He is also a member of the Houston-based rap group The Nice Guys.

ChopNotSlop Radio
ChopNotSlop Radio is an online radio station that specializes in ChopNotSlop music. It is the first 24 hours chopped and screwed radio station. It was created in 2008 with the intentions of helping keep the subgenre that DJ Screw had created alive. The station currently has one live show every Sunday that features OG RON C, DJ Candlestick, DJ Slim K, DJ Lil Steve and DJ Hollygrove with live-on-air turntablism where they chop and screw music.

Partial discography 
 2011: Chop Care: Drake OG Ron C Edition
 2015: Little Dragon Nabuma Purple Rubberband 
2017: Moonlight Soundtrack

See also
 List of record labels
 Houston hip hop

References

External links
 OG Ron C Official Website

1985 births
African-American record producers
American DJs
American hip hop record producers
American radio personalities
Living people
Rappers from Houston
Southern hip hop musicians
21st-century American rappers
Record producers from Texas
21st-century African-American musicians
20th-century African-American people